Bian Yuqian (born 14 June 1990) is a Chinese female volleyball player. She was part of the China women's national volleyball team.

She participated in the 2010 FIVB Volleyball Women's World Championship.
 She played with Shanghai.

Clubs
 Shanghai (2006–present)

References

External links
http://www.fivb.org/viewPressRelease.asp?No=24055&Language=en#.WN1JZlUrLIU

1990 births
Living people
Chinese women's volleyball players
Place of birth missing (living people)
Universiade medalists in volleyball
Setters (volleyball)
Universiade silver medalists for China
Medalists at the 2011 Summer Universiade
21st-century Chinese women